Eetu Pennanen (born 18 September 1992) is a Finnish volleyball player for the Finnish national team.

He participated at the 2017 Men's European Volleyball Championship.

References

1992 births
Living people
Finnish men's volleyball players
Place of birth missing (living people)